Padala is a village in West Godavari district of the Indian state of Andhra Pradesh. It is located in Tadepalligudem mandal of Eluru revenue division.

References

Villages in East Godavari district